Hababeh-ye Sofla (also Romanized as Ḩabābeh-ye Soflá; also known as Ḩabābeh-ye Pā’īn) is a village in Chah Salem Rural District, in the Central District of Omidiyeh County, Khuzestan Province, Iran. At the 2006 census, its population was 107, in 23 families.

References 

Populated places in Omidiyeh County